The 600 metres is a rarely run middle-distance running event in track and field competitions. It is most often run at high school indoor track and field competitions.

All-time top 25
 i = indoor performance
 A = affected by altitude
 h = hand timing

Men
 Correct as of March 2023.

Notes
Below is a list of other times equal or superior to 1:14.80:
 John Kipkurgat also ran 1:13.2  (1974).
 David Rudisha also ran 1:13.71 (2014), 1:14.30 (2012), and 1:14.4  (2010).
 Joseph Mutua Mwengi also ran 1:13.72 (2003).
 Donavan Brazier also ran 1:13.97 (2022) and 1:14.39 (2020).
 Johnny Gray also ran 1:14.16 (1984).
 Duane Solomon also ran 1:14.43 (2014).
 Ryan Sánchez also ran 1:14.52 (2019).
 Adam Kszczot also ran 1:14.69 (2014).

Women
 Correct as of January 2023.

Notes
Below is a list of other times equal or superior to 1:24.70:
 Maria Mutola also ran 1:23.13 (2003).
 Pamela Jelimo also ran 1:24.08 (2008).
 Athing Mu also ran 1:23.57  (2019), 1:24.13 (2022).
 Anita Weiß also ran 1:24.30 (1976).
 Ajee' Wilson also ran 1:23.84 (2017), 1:24.48 (2017).

References

Events in track and field
Middle-distance running